The 2001 Tonga rugby union tour of Great Britain was a series of matches played in November 2001 in Scotland and Wales by Tonga national rugby union team.

References

Tonga
2001
2001–02 in Scottish rugby union
2001–02 in Welsh rugby union
2001 in Tongan rugby union
2001 in Oceanian rugby union
2001
2001